Pascaline Wangui (born 30 November 1960 in Nakuru, Rift Valley) is a retired female long-distance runner from Kenya, who twice (1988 and 1992) competed for her native country at the Summer Olympics in the women's marathon. She set her personal best (2:37:23) in the classic distance on 20 January 1991, finishing fourth in the Houston Marathon.

Achievements

External links
sports-reference

1991 ARRS ranking

1960 births
Living people
Kenyan female long-distance runners
Athletes (track and field) at the 1988 Summer Olympics
Athletes (track and field) at the 1992 Summer Olympics
Olympic athletes of Kenya
People from Nakuru
20th-century Kenyan women